Line 10 of the Shenyang Metro is a rapid transit line running from northwest to southwest Shenyang in "コ" shape. The line opened on 29 April 2020.

The line is 27.21 km long with 21 stations. Line 10, together with Line 9 will form a loop around Shenyang.

Opening timeline

Stations

References

10
Railway lines opened in 2020
2020 establishments in China